Ruth Wilson (born 1982) is a British actress.

Ruth Wilson may also refer to:

Ruth Wilson (missing person), a 16-year-old who disappeared in the UK in 1995
Ruth Wilson (Neighbours), a character from Australian soap Neighbours, played by Stephanie Daniel

See also
Ruth Wilson Epstein, American nurse married to alleged spy Jacob Epstein
Ruth Wilson Gilmore (born 1950), American prison abolitionist and prison scholar